Luíz Trochillo, best known as Luizinho and named fans Pequeno Polegar (born in São Paulo, Brasil, March 7, 1930 – died January 17, 1998) was an association footballer who played as a striker.

He was a skilled dribbler and for some veteran Corinthians supporters
the greatest player of the club history.

He played entire career (1949–1967) with Corinthians, except in season 1962–63 when play for Clube Atlético Juventus. He won three São Paulo State Championship in 1951, 1952 and 1954. He died at 67 years old.

References

1930 births
1998 deaths
Brazilian footballers
Brazilian people of Italian descent
Association football forwards
Sport Club Corinthians Paulista players
Clube Atlético Juventus players
Brazilian football managers
Sport Club Corinthians Paulista managers
Footballers from São Paulo